"Sic Transit Gloria...Glory Fades" is a single by American rock band Brand New from their second album Deja Entendu. "Sic Transit Gloria... Glory Fades" was released to radio on November 18, 2003.

The title itself comes from the 1998 film Rushmore, "Sic transit gloria... Glory fades" being one of main character Max Fischer's most memorable lines. The full latin phrase from which this is derived is Sic transit gloria mundi (Latin: "Thus passes the glory of the world"). This phrase has its origins in Ancient Rome, is used during papal coronations.

Meaning 
The lyrics of "Sic Transit Gloria... Glory Fades" tell the story of an inexperienced teenage boy being taken advantage of and losing his virginity to an older woman. Lacey stated that "I... figured that I wouldn't really have sex until either I was married or I knew I was with the right person. When you get to being 21, 22, 23 years old... it becomes this whole other thing, like 'Well, what am I doing? Is this really important to me?'"

Reception 
In 2022, Variety named "Sic Transit Gloria... Glory Fades" as one of the 25 best emo songs of all time, praising how "the driving bassline and charging guitars hits a Pavlovian response to sing along."

Music video 
The music video for "Sic Transit Gloria... Glory Fades" portrays vocalist Jesse Lacey as a human voodoo doll, who has the ability to move the body parts of other people through moving his own. "Since the song is about taking advantage of someone else," he said, "there's a pretty strong correlation between the video and the song." The idea came from director Marc Webb, who held onto the idea for a long time.

The video raises parallels to two videos by the band Yellowcard, the strongest of which is the appearance of a white lamb on the door to the bar that Jesse Lacey enters. The symbol is also present on the briefcase that Ryan Key carries through the videos for "Ocean Avenue" and "Rough Landing, Holly." This is because the videos were directed by Webb, who used the lamb in his videos as a signature of sorts.

It was rumored that the silhouette figure during the last shot in the video is Geoff Rickly,
lead singer of the band Thursday (who are from nearby New Jersey), although it was actually Todd Weinstock, guitarist for Glassjaw.

Release 
The 7" was pressed on light pink vinyl and features a demo version of the song "Jaws Theme Swimming." This demo song was recorded and mixed by Mike Sapone.

In 2013, the song was covered by American pop punk band We Are the In Crowd.

Track listing

Charts

References

2004 singles
2003 songs
Brand New (band) songs
Music videos directed by Marc Webb
Songs written by Jesse Lacey
Songs written by Vincent Accardi